Andromache is an Athenian tragedy by Euripides. It dramatises Andromache's life as a slave, years after the events of the Trojan War, and her conflict with her master's new wife, Hermione. The date of its first performance is unknown. Some scholars place the date sometime between 428 and 425 BC. Müller places it between 420 and 417 BC. A Byzantine scholion to the play suggests that its first production was staged outside Athens, though modern scholarship regards this claim as dubious.

Background
During the Trojan War, Achilles killed Andromache's husband Hector. Homer describes Andromache's lament, after Hector's death, that their young son Astyanax will suffer poverty growing up without a father. Instead, the conquering Greeks threw Astyanax to his death from the Trojan walls, for fear that he would grow up to avenge his father and city. Andromache was made a slave of Achilles' son Neoptolemus.

Years pass and Andromache has a child with Neoptolemus. Neoptolemus weds Hermione, daughter of Menelaus and Helen. Even though Andromache is still devoted to her dead husband Hector, Hermione is deeply jealous and plots her revenge. Fearing for her life and the life of her child, Andromache hides the child and seeks refuge in the temple of Thetis (who was the mother of Achilles).

Plot synopsis
Clinging to the altar of the sea-goddess Thetis for sanctuary, Andromache delivers the play's prologue, in which she mourns her misfortune (the destruction of Troy, the deaths of her husband Hector and their child Astyanax, and her enslavement to Neoptolemos) and her persecution at the hands of Neoptolemos' new wife Hermione and her father Menelaus, King of Sparta. She reveals that Neoptolemos has left for the oracle at Delphi and that she has hidden the son she bore him (whose name is Molossos) for fear that Menelaus will try to kill him as well as her.

A Maid arrives to warn her that Menelaus knows the location of her son and is on his way to capture him. Andromache persuades her to risk seeking the help of the king, Peleus (husband of Thetis, Achilles' father, and Neoptolemos' grandfather). Andromache laments her misfortunes again and weeps at the feet of the statue of Thetis. The párodos of the chorus follows, in which they express their desire to help Andromache and try to persuade her to leave the sanctuary. Just at the moment that they express their fearfulness of discovery by Hermione, she arrives, boasting of her wealth, status, and liberty.

Hermione engages in an extended agôn with Andromache, in which they exchange a long rhetorical speech initially, each accusing the other. Hermione accuses Andromache of practising oriental witchcraft to make her barren and attempting to turn her husband against her and to displace her. "Learn your new-found place," she demands. She condemns the Trojans as barbarians who practise incest and polygamy. Their agon continues in a series of rapid stichomythic exchanges.

When Menelaus arrives and reveals that he has found her son, Andromache allows herself to be led away. The intervention of the aged Peleus (the grandfather of Neoptolemus) saves them. Orestes, who has contrived the murder of Neoptolemus at Delphi and who arrives unexpectedly, carries off Hermione, to whom he had been betrothed before Neoptolemus had claimed her. The murder of Neoptolemus by Orestes and men of Delphi is described in detail by the Messenger to Peleus. The goddess Thetis appears as a deus ex machina and divines the future for Neoptolemus' corpse, Peleus, Andromache and Molossus.

Context
The odious character which Euripides attributes to Menelaus has been seen as according with the feeling against Sparta that prevailed at the time at Athens. He is portrayed as an arrogant tyrant and a physical coward, and his daughter Hermione is portrayed as excessively concerned with her husband's faithfulness, and capable of plotting to kill an innocent child (of Andromache) in order to clear the household of rival sons for the throne; she is also portrayed as wealthy, with her own money, and this is said by some of the characters (notably Andromache and Peleus) to make her high-handed. Peleus curses Sparta several times during the play.

Translations
 Edward P. Coleridge, 1891 – prose, full text at 
 Gilbert Murray, 1901 – prose, 1912 verse
 Arthur S. Way, 1912 – verse
 Hugh O. Meredith, 1937 – verse
 Van L. Johnson, 1955 – prose
 John Frederick Nims, 1956 – verse: available for digital loan
 David Kovacs, 1987 – prose, full text at 
 James Morwood, 1997 – prose
 Robert Cannon, 1997 – verse
 Susan Stewart and Wesley D. Smith, 2001 - verse
 George Theodoridis, 2001 – prose, full text at 
 Bruce Vandeventer, 2012 – verse

References

Sources
 Cannon, Robert, trans. 1997. Andromache. In Plays: V. By Euripides. Ed. J. Michael Walton. Classical Greek Dramatists ser. London: Methuen. 1–62. .
 Ley, Graham. 2007. The Theatricality of Greek Tragedy: Playing Space and Chorus. Chicago and London: U of Chicago P. .
 Walton, J. Michael. 1997. Introduction. In Plays: V. By Euripides. Ed. J. Michael Walton. Classical Greek Dramatists ser. London: Methuen. vii–xxiii. .

Plays by Euripides
Trojan War literature
Slavery in ancient Greece
Peloponnesian War
Thessalian mythology
Epirotic mythology
Plays about slavery
Plays set in ancient Greece
Delphi in fiction
Plays based on classical mythology